Ralph Herbert White (born June 15, 1948) is a former basketball player during the 1970–71 season for the Atlanta Hawks. At 6'2" and 195 lbs., he played as a guard/forward.

Born in Valdosta, Georgia, White attended Decatur High School in Decatur, Georgia. He was voted the number one high school player in Georgia by the Atlanta Journal-Constitution in his senior year at Decatur High School.

He went to the University of Georgia and as a senior in 1969-70, the starting forward averaged 9.8 points and 6.4 rebounds per game for the 13-12 Bulldogs.

He was drafted in the eighth round (133rd overall) of the 1970 NBA Draft by the Atlanta Hawks. He played in 38 games, starting five, serving primarily as a backup to fellow rookie and future Hall-of-Famer Pete Maravich. He was also Maravich's roommate on the road. For the season, his only one in the NBA, he averaged 2.4 points, 1.3 rebounds and 1.2 assists per game. His most productive game came on December 29, 1970 as he scored 10 points against the Detroit Pistons.

Known for his great leaping ability, White's nickname was "The Elevator from Decatur". He was cited by Hall-of-Famer Wilt Chamberlain as the greatest dunker he ever saw during pregame warmups. He once received a standing ovation from the Madison Square Garden crowd for his pre-game dunking show.

White was drafted into the U.S. Army in March 1971. He later played professional basketball in Europe and in Mexico.

In 2013, White received the most nominations for the Atlanta Journal-Constitution's list of the 10 greatest dunkers in Georgia high school history.

White served as a Senior Account Representative for Georgia Public Broadcasting from 1991 to 2009. In 1993, he and producer Tom Vardase brought high school sports programming to GPB, securing funding for the initial season of Prep Sports +, which went on to become the longest-running high school sports show in the country. In 1997, they negotiated the rights to the Georgia state high school football semifinals and finals, GPB's high school sports programming has expanded to include the boys and girls basketball championships and the wrestling and cheerleading championships. White has raised over $4 million in corporate funding for high school sports on GPB.

White resides in Mexico with his wife, Wanda.

White is also a frequent and beloved poster (under the appropriate handle "elevator") for Georgia Bulldogs basketball on the UGASports.com forums, particularly the "Hoop Dawgs" basketball forum.

References

External links

1948 births
Living people
Atlanta Hawks draft picks
Atlanta Hawks players
Basketball players from Georgia (U.S. state)
Georgia Bulldogs basketball players
People from Valdosta, Georgia
Point guards
American men's basketball players